WBFT-LP (105.5 FM) was a radio station licensed to Micco, Florida, United States.  The station was owned by the Brevard County Board of County Commissioners.

Along with Space Coast Government Television, and WBCC, the low power FM radio station was used by Brevard County officials to broadcast information in the event of an emergency. During times of non-emergency, the station broadcast either a simulcast of SCGTV audio, National Weather Service NOAA Weather Radio audio, or FEMA Public Service Announcements.

This station was originally funded via federal grant money for capital equipment cost with the operational expenses paid for by Brevard County. A basic radio studio was installed inside the Brevard County EOC in Rockledge with control & editing equipment to support the station. The station was placed on-air in 2004 immediately prior to Hurricane Charley due to the efforts of Sharon Luba, Space Coast Government Television, Ray Kassis, WWBC/WMIE and Eric Conklin, Brevard County Emergency Management. The station served the population of Grant, Micco, Barefoot Bay, Valkaria, Southern Palm Bay, and the South Brevard beaches to the south Melbourne Beach boundary. The station's signal did reach the communities of Sebastian and Roseland in northern Indian River County, and an informal cooperative agreement was in place between Brevard and Indian River County to transmit emergency information for Indian River County Emergency Management should the need arise. The station permanently left the air as of September 15, 2010, due to fiscal expenditure reductions by the Board of County Commissioners scheduled to take place in the FY 2011 County budget. The broadcast station license was returned to the FCC for cancellation.

References

External links
 

BFT-LP
BFT-LP
Brevard County, Florida
Defunct radio stations in the United States
2010 disestablishments in Florida
Radio stations disestablished in 2010
BFT-LP